Jacqueline Rose, FBA (born 1949 in London) is a British academic who is Professor of Humanities at the Birkbeck Institute for the Humanities.

Life and work

Jacqueline Rose is known for her work on the relationship between psychoanalysis, feminism and literature. She is a graduate of St Hilda's College, Oxford, and gained her higher degree (maîtrise) from the Sorbonne, Paris. She took her doctorate from the University of London, where she was supervised by Frank Kermode. Her elder sister was the philosopher Gillian Rose.

Rose's book Albertine, a novel from 2001, is a feminist variation on Marcel Proust's À la recherche du temps perdu.

Rose is best known for her critical study on the life and work of American poet Sylvia Plath, The Haunting of Sylvia Plath, published in 1991. In the book, Rose offers a postmodernist feminist interpretation of Plath's work, and criticises Plath's husband Ted Hughes and other editors of Plath's writing. Rose describes the hostility she experienced from Hughes and his sister (who acts as literary executor to Plath's estate) including threats received from Hughes about some of Rose's analysis of Plath's poem "The Rabbit Catcher". The Haunting of Sylvia Plath was critically acclaimed, and itself subject to a famous critique by Janet Malcolm in her book The Silent Woman: Sylvia Plath and Ted Hughes.

Rose is a broadcaster and contributor to the London Review of Books.

Rose's States of Fantasy was the inspiration for composer Mohammed Fairouz's Double Concerto of the same title.

Criticism of Israel
Rose is highly critical of Zionism, describing it as "[having] been traumatic for the Jews as well as the Palestinians". In the same interview, Rose continues to say, citing Martin Buber and Ahad Ha'am: "If Zionism can produce voices such as these, this is evidence of a fermentation of rare value."

Bibliography
 
 
 
 
 
 
  (novel)

References

External links

"Those opposing a cultural and academic boycott of Israel should examine the South African precedent, says Jacqueline Rose." Open Democracy September 4 2005 Jacqueline Rose's position on an academic and cultural boycott of Israel
"This land is your land", The Observer, August 18, 2002 – Jacqueline Rose's views on the state of Israel
"What Zionism is Not, a review of The Question of Zion from a Zionist perspective, The Weekly Standard, 14 November 2005
Interview, The Guardian, January 4, 2003
"The Ideas Interview: Jacqueline Rose" – John Sutherland, The Guardian, 28 November 2005
Interview with Jacqueline Rose, Open Democracy, August 18, 2005
Israel and Resistance: an interview with Jacqueline Rose, State of Nature, Winter 2008
Video of Jacqueline Rose chairing a discussion with Avi Shlaim and Shlomo Sand at the Frontline Club, London, 12 November 2009

1949 births
Academics of Queen Mary University of London
Alumni of St Hilda's College, Oxford
British feminists
Jewish feminists
British Jews
Jewish philosophers
Fellows of the British Academy
Living people
People educated at Ealing County Grammar School for Girls
Translators of Jacques Lacan
University of Paris alumni
Women and psychology
Writers of books about writing fiction
20th-century British women writers
20th-century British non-fiction writers
21st-century British women writers
21st-century British non-fiction writers